The SD 15 (Sprengbombe Dickwandig) or thick walled explosive bomb in English was a fragmentation bomb used by the Luftwaffe during World War II.

History 
The second most used category of bombs was the SD series which were high-explosive bombs but with thicker casings which meant their charge to weight ratio was only 30 to 40% of their total weight.  Bombs in this series were the SD 1, SD 1 FRZ, SD 2, SD 10 A, SD 10 FRZ, SD 10 C, SD 15, SD 50, SD 70, SD 250, SD 500, SD 1400, and SD 1700. The number in the bombs designation corresponded to the approximate weight of the bomb.

Design 
The body of the SD 15 was of one piece cast steel construction and was a conversion of high-explosive projectiles used by the 10.5 cm leFH 18 howitzers of the German Army.  The bomb was filled through the nose with TNT and was internally threaded for a nose fuze.  The tail cone was composed of four sheet steel sections that were welded together and crimped into an annular groove machined in the rear 1/3 of the projectile.  The SD 15 was used as a sub-munition and 24 could be carried by the AB 500-1D cluster bomb.  The body was painted dark green with a khaki colored tail.

See also
 List of weapons of military aircraft of Germany during World War II

References

World War II aerial bombs of Germany